Camelot is a strategy board game for two players. It was invented by George S. Parker late in the 19th century, and was one of the first games published by Parker Brothers, originally under the name Chivalry.

The game was reissued as "Camelot" in 1930, with reduced size and number of pieces. It flourished through numerous editions and variants, achieving its greatest popularity in the 1930s, and remained in print through the late 1960s. Parker Brothers briefly republished the game in the 1980s under the name Inside Moves. Since then it has been out of print, but retains a core of fans anticipating another revival.

Camelot is easy to learn and without extensive theory or praxis, making it perhaps more accessible for novices to play/enjoy compared to chess. Gameplay is exceptionally tactical almost from the first move, so games are quick to play to a finish.

A World Camelot Federation exists, with free membership, led by Michael W. Nolan. Camelot was featured in Abstract Games magazine in 2001 and 2002.

History

In 1882, George S. Parker began working on an abstract board game called Chivalry. His goal was to create a game not so difficult as chess, but considerably more varied than checkers. Parker created a game that was a complex, tactical, but an easily learned and quickly played mixture of Halma and checkers. When finally published by Geo. S. Parker & Co. in 1887, Chivalry won the raves of chess and checkers experts, but the game Parker called "the best game in 2000 years" did not catch on quickly with the general public.

However, Parker never lost his enthusiasm for the game, and in 1930 he made a few changes, and Parker Brothers republished it under the name "Camelot".  A few more rules changes followed in 1931. Camelot enjoyed its greatest popularity in the 1930s.

Camelot players included José Raúl Capablanca, World Chess Champion from 1921 to 1927, and Frank Marshall, U.S. Chess Champion from 1907 to 1936. Sidney Lenz and Milton Work, two world-famous bridge players, also played the game.

There were over 50 different editions of Camelot sets issued, including a gold-stamped leather edition and a mahogany cabinet edition. There were tournament editions, regular editions, and low-cost editions. Camelot was eventually discontinued in 1968, then reissued as "Inside Moves" in 1985, and finally discontinued again in 1986.

Parker Brothers marketed several game variants. Grand Camelot, a variant for four players on a special large board, was released in 1932. Cam, a variant played on a miniature board, came out in 1949. There was also a Point Camelot variant, three-handed and four-handed variants, and even a variant called Camelotta. None of these variants ever achieved the popularity of the basic game.

Game rules
The game is played on a board of 160 squares, which is roughly rectangular (12×14), with three squares removed from each of the four corners, and four extra squares extending outside the main rectangle, two each at the top and bottom of the board. These two-square areas are called the castles. Each player starts the game with fourteen pieces: four knights and ten men, set up as shown (see diagram).

Winning
The object of the game is to be the first player to occupy the opponent's castle with two of your own pieces, or, to capture all of your opponent's pieces while retaining two or more of your own pieces.

Move rules
Both knights and men can move either horizontally, vertically, or diagonally in three ways, as follows:
 One space in any direction (like a king in chess).  This is called a plain move.
 A leaping move (called cantering) over an adjacent friendly piece to a vacant space immediately beyond. Multiple leaps over a player's own pieces are permitted. Cantering is always optional (never obligatory).
 A jumping move over an adjacent enemy piece to a vacant space immediately beyond. The enemy piece is captured and removed from the board. As in checkers, multiple jumps are allowed, and capturing is obligatory whenever it is possible.

Men may make any of the three moves, but only one type of move per turn. Knights have a fourth option: a combination move consisting of a canter immediately followed by a jump (capture). This is called the knight's charge. The knight may, in this single move, perform multiple canters (or just one), followed by multiple jumps (or just one); but the canter(s) must precede the jump(s). A knight may not combine a plain move with a canter or a jump.

Sample game
White: Michael Nolan  Black: Dan Troyka  Event: WCF Camelot World Championship, game 4; March 2009

1.E6-G8  I11-G9
2.H6-J8  I10-G12
3.F6-H8  J11-I11
4.J6-H6  D11-F9?
5.J8-I9?!  G12-I10xI8
6.H8xJ8  C11-E9?
7.G8-F8  I11-H12
8.F8-F6  H12-G12
9.J8-I9  H10xJ8?
10.H6-F8xH10xH12xF12xH10  D10-F8xH6xJ6xH8xH6
11.G6xI6  E9-G9xI11
12.I6-I7!  J8xH6
13.F7-G7!  H6xF8
14.E7xG9xE9xG11xG9  I11-H12
15.G9-F8  H12-G12
16.F6-E7  G12-F12
17.D7-E6?  E11-F10
18.C6-D5  F12-G11
19.F8-F7  F11-G10
20.D6-F6  E10-F9
21.D5-D6  G11-H10
22.F6-G7  F9-F11-H9
23.D6-F6  F10-G11
24.G7-H8  H9xH7
25.E6-G8xI6  G11-G9
26.E7-G7  G10-H9
27.I6-H6  G9-I9
28.F7-H7  H10-H8?
29.F6-G6!?  H8xF6
30.G6-I8xI10xG8  1–0 (Black →)

World Camelot Federation
The World Camelot Federation (WCF), an international non-profit organization, was formed by Michael Wortley Nolan in 1999 to preserve and popularize the game. The WCF has introduced some rules clarifications, additions, and changes. It organized a Camelot World Championship tournament with twelve participants, which concluded in June 2003, with Dan Troyka of Michigan winning the World Champion title. A new World Championship tournament began in 2008 and concluded in 2009, with Troyka retaining his crown.

Official WCF rules

Players
The game of Camelot is played between two opponents who move pieces alternately on a Camelot board. The two players are called White and Black. The players choose for color. White moves first.

Playing surface
The Camelot board contains 160 squares of identical size.  Ranks are rows of squares, numbered 1 through 16, running horizontally from one side of the board to the other.  Files are columns of squares, lettered A through L, running vertically from one end of the board to the other.  The squares of the board, with their actual Camelot designation used for game notation, from the bottom rank to the top rank, from the left-most file to the right-most file, are: F1, G1, C2, D2, E2, F2, G2, H2, I2, J2, B3, C3, D3, E3, F3, G3, H3, I3, J3, K3, A4, B4, C4, D4, E4, F4, G4, H4, I4, J4, K4, L4, A5, B5, C5, D5, E5, F5, G5, H5, I5, J5, K5, L5, A6, B6, C6, D6, E6, F6, G6, H6, I6, J6, K6, L6, A7, B7, C7, D7, E7, F7, G7, H7, I7, J7, K7, L7, A8, B8, C8, D8, E8, F8, G8, H8, I8, J8, K8, L8, A9, B9, C9, D9, E9, F9, G9, H9, I9, J9, K9, L9, A10, B10, C10, D10, E10, F10, G10, H10, I10, J10, K10, L10, A11, B11, C11, D11, E11, F11, G11, H11, I11, J11, K11, L11, A12, B12, C12, D12, E12, F12, G12, H12, I12, J12, K12, L12, A13, B13, C13, D13, E13, F13, G13, H13, I13, J13, K13, L13, B14, C14, D14, E14, F14, G14, H14, I14, J14, K14, C15, D15, E15, F15, G15, H15, I15, J15, F16, G16.  White's Castle is composed of two Castle Squares F1 and G1, and Black's Castle is composed of two Castle Squares F16 and G16.

Pieces
Each player begins the game with 14 pieces: four Knights and ten Men.  The starting positions are: White Knights on C6, D7, I7, and J6, White Men on D6, E6, E7, F6, F7, G6, G7, H6, H7, and I6, Black Knights on C11, D10, I10, and J11, and Black Men on D11, E10, E11, F10, F11, G10, G11, H10, H11, and I11.

Moves

The plain move
A piece (either Knight or Man) may move one square in any direction (horizontally, vertically, or diagonally) to any adjoining unoccupied square.  This move is called a Plain Move.

The canter
A piece (either Knight or Man) may leap in any direction (horizontally, vertically, or diagonally) over a friendly piece (either Knight or Man) that occupies an adjoining square, provided that there is an unoccupied square immediately beyond it in a direct line onto which the leap may be made.  This move is called a Canter.  Pieces cantered over are not removed from the board.  A player may canter over more than one piece during the same move, but may not make a Canter that ends on the same square from which it began.  When cantering over more than one piece in a move, the direction of the move may be varied after each Canter.  A player is never compelled to canter, nor when cantering is he compelled to canter as far as possible.

The jump
A piece (either Knight or Man) may leap in any direction (horizontally, vertically, or diagonally) over an opposing piece (either Knight or Man) that occupies an adjoining square, provided there is an unoccupied square immediately beyond it in a direct line onto which the leap may be made.  This move is called a Jump.  Each enemy piece jumped over is captured and immediately removed from the board.  A player is obliged to jump if any one of his pieces is next to an exposed enemy piece.  Having jumped over one enemy piece, the jumping must continue as a part of that same move if the player's piece reaches a square next to another exposed enemy piece.  When jumping over more than one piece, the direction of the move may be varied after each Jump.  If presented with capturing alternatives, a player may choose which opposing piece to capture, and with which of his pieces to effect the capture.  When compelled to jump, a player may, if he can, capture by a Knight's Charge instead.  The only situation in which a player may ignore his obligation to jump is when, on his previous move, he has jumped one of his pieces over an opponent's piece into his own castle, ending his turn there, and must, on his next turn, immediately move that piece out from his castle.

The knight's charge
A Knight (only) may combine a Canter and a Jump in a single move, called a Knight's Charge.  A Knight's Charge must follow the order of first the Canter(s) and last the Jump(s).  A Knight is never obliged to make a Knight's Charge.  When cantering over more than one piece during the cantering portion of a Knight's Charge, the direction of the move may be varied after each Canter.  If the Canter of a Knight brings it next to an enemy piece that can be jumped, it must do so, unless by a different route later in that same move it captures one or more enemy pieces elsewhere.  Having jumped over one enemy piece during the jumping portion of a Knight's Charge, the jumping must continue as a part of that same move if the player's Knight reaches a square next to another exposed enemy piece.

Notation
The Plain Move is indicated by the notation "-" placed between the starting square and the ending square, e.g., C8-D9.  The Canter is indicated by the notation "-" placed between the starting square, landed upon intermediate squares (if any), and the ending square, e.g., E6-C8-A8.  The Jump is indicated by the notation "x" placed between the starting square, landed upon intermediate squares (if any), and the ending square, e.g., H4xJ4xL6.  The Knight's Charge is indicated by the notation "-" placed between the beginning square of the cantering portion, landed upon intermediate squares (if any), and the ending square of the cantering portion, and the notation "x" placed between the ending square of the cantering portion (the beginning square of the jumping portion), landed upon intermediate squares (if any), and the ending square of the jumping portion, e.g., F6-F8-H8xH10xJ12.

Object
The game is won if a player moves any two of his pieces (Knights and/or Men) into his opponent's castle.  Or, the game is won if a player captures all of his opponent's pieces, and has two or more of his own pieces left.  Or, the game is won if a player has two or more pieces, and his opponent is unable to make a legal move.

Drawn game
The game is drawn if both players have no more than one piece left.

Player's own castle
A player may not plain-move or canter one of his pieces (Knight or Man) into his own castle.  If an enemy piece reaches a square adjacent to his own castle, a player may jump, or make the jumping portion of a Knight's Charge, over that enemy piece into his own castle.  A player may not, during the cantering portion of a Knight's Charge, move his Knight into his own castle.  If a player jumps over an opponent's piece into his own castle, and the player's piece is then next to an exposed enemy piece, the jumping must continue (out of his own castle) as part of that same move.  A player who has jumped one of his pieces over an opponent's piece into his own castle, and in so doing was unable to continue the jumping out of his own castle as part of that same move, must, on his next turn to move, immediately move that piece out from his own castle, with no exception.  A player moving one of his pieces out from his own castle must jump out, if possible, instead of plain-moving or cantering out.  If a player has the opportunity to jump out from his own castle, he may, if he can, satisfy the obligation to capture by means of moving out with a Knight's Charge instead.

Opponent's castle
A piece that has entered his opponent's castle cannot come out, but is allowed to move from one castle square to the other (designated a castle move).  A player is limited to two castle moves during a game.

Notes

References

External links
 Official website World Camelot Federation (WCF)
 Zillions of Games free Camelot rules file
 igGameCenter Camelot rules with illustrations
 

Board games
Abstract strategy games
Waddingtons games
Parker Brothers games